Stella Bonheur (5 December 1904 – 10 October 1997) was a British actress.

She also appeared on stage, e.g. in Rookery Nook, one of the Aldwych farces by Ben Travers.

Selected filmography
 Red Wagon (1933)
 The Elder Brother (1937)
 Behind Your Back (1937)
 Wanted! (1937)
 The End of the Line (1957)
 The Treasure of San Teresa (1959)
 Identity Unknown (1960)
 Compelled (1960)
 The Roman Spring of Mrs. Stone (1961)

References

External links

1904 births
1997 deaths
Actresses from London
British film actresses
English stage actresses
20th-century British actresses
20th-century English women
20th-century English people